Bryne Church is a parish church of the Church of Norway in Time Municipality in Rogaland county, Norway. It is located in the town of Bryne. It is the church for the Bryne parish which is part of the Jæren prosti (deanery) in the Diocese of Stavanger. The red, brick church was built in a long church style in 1979 using designs by the architect Per Stokholm. The church seats about 450 people.

See also
List of churches in Rogaland

References

Time, Norway
Churches in Rogaland
Brick churches in Norway
20th-century Church of Norway church buildings
Churches completed in 1979
1979 establishments in Norway